Kari-Pekka Syväjärvi (born 26 November 1987) is a Finnish former footballer.

References

External links
 

1987 births
Living people
Finnish footballers
Association football goalkeepers
Rovaniemen Palloseura players
FC Santa Claus players